LGR may refer to:
 London Greek Radio
 L.G.R (brand), Italian eyewear manufacturer
 LGR Sportswear, Philippines
 Walther LGR, air rifle
 Lake Geneva Raceway, former racetrack in Wisconsin
 Let's Get Ready (organization)
 Lazy Game Reviews, a YouTube channel created by Clint Basinger